Sport climbing made its Olympic debut at the 2020 Summer Olympics in Tokyo, Japan. The Olympics was originally scheduled to be held in 2020, but was postponed to 2021 due to COVID-19 pandemic. It is governed by the International Federation of Sport Climbing (IFSC).

Bid for inclusion 
The inclusion was proposed by the International Federation of Sport Climbing (IFSC) in 2015. In September 2015, sport climbing was included in a shortlist along with baseball, softball, skateboarding, surfing, and karate to be considered for inclusion in the 2020 Summer Olympics; and in June 2016, the executive board of the International Olympic Committee (IOC) announced that they would support the proposal to include all of the shortlisted sports in the 2020 Games. Finally, on August 3, 2016, all five sports (counting baseball and softball together as one sport) were approved for inclusion in the 2020 Olympic program.

Competition format 
At the 2020 Summer Olympics, two sport climbing events were contested: men's combined and women's combined. The competition format combined three disciplines of sport climbing: speed climbing, bouldering, and lead climbing. This decision caused widespread criticism in the climbing community.

Members of the IFSC explained that they were only granted one gold medal per gender by the Olympic committee and they did not want to exclude speed climbing. The IFSC's goal for the 2020 Olympics was primarily to establish climbing and its three disciplines as Olympic sports; changes to the format could follow later. This tactic proved to be successful as they were granted a second set of medals for the 2024 Summer Olympics, where speed climbing will be a separate event from the combined event of lead climbing and bouldering.

Events

Participating nations
The following nations have taken part in the sport climbing competition. The numbers in the table indicate the number of competitors sent to that year's Olympics.

Olympic records history

Medal table

Medalists

Men's combined

Speed

Women's combined

Women’s speed

References

External links 

 Olympic Committee – International Federation of Sport Climbing
 International Federation of Sport Climbing

 
Sports at the Summer Olympics